Stanisław Pawłowski (born 8 May 1966) is a Polish wrestler. He competed in the men's Greco-Roman 57 kg at the 1996 Summer Olympics.

References

1966 births
Living people
Polish male sport wrestlers
Olympic wrestlers of Poland
Wrestlers at the 1996 Summer Olympics
People from Wałbrzych
Sportspeople from Lower Silesian Voivodeship